Ernest Morrell (born April 27, 1971) is an American university professor, currently the Coyle Professor in Literacy Education at Notre Dame. In July 2021, he will also become the Associate Dean for the Humanities and Equity in the College of Arts and Letters. 

He is also the founder and president of Desert Highway Music which produced blues and folk music with the intention of keeping American art forms alive.

Education 
Morrell earned a Bachelor of Arts degree in English at the University of California, Santa Barbara in 1993, his California teaching credential in Secondary English (1994), Master of Arts degree in education (1997), and Ph.D. in Language, Literacy and Culture (2001) from the University of California, Berkeley.

Professional career 
Morrell began his teaching career as an English teacher at Oakland High School in Oakland, California in 1994. While continuing to teach at Oakland High School, Morrell served as an instructor at the University of California Berkeley and supervised student teachers for the University of San Francisco. 

Beginning 1999, he served as a research associate at Center X  and an adjunct faculty member in the Graduate School of Education at the University of California, Los Angeles. Morrell was then an assistant professor in the Department of Teacher Education and an affiliated faculty member of the African-American and African Studies and Writing, Rhetoric and American Cultures departments at Michigan State University from 2001 to 2005. From 2002 to 2004, Morrell continued as a visiting assistant professor at UCLA. In 2005, Morrell became a tenure-track assistant professor. In 2007, Morrell earned tenure and became an associate professor at UCLA.

He later became the Macy Professor of English Education and Director of the Institute for Urban and Minority Education (IUME) at Teachers College, Columbia University. 

He then transitioned to Notre Dame, where he will in July become the Associate Dean for the Humanities and Equity in the College of Arts and Letters. He is concurrently the Coyle Professor in Literacy Education, teaches English and Africana Studies, and is director of the Notre Dame Center for Literacy Education.

He is also an elected member of the AERA Council, elected Fellow of the American Educational Research Association, a past-president of the National Council of Teachers of English, an appointed member of the International Literacy Association’s Research Panel, and convener of the African Diaspora International Research Network

Scholarship and publications 
Morrell is the author of four books: Becoming Critical Researchers: Literacy and Empowerment for Urban Youth, Linking Literacy and Popular Culture: Finding Connections for Lifelong Learning, Critical Literacy and Urban Youth: Pedagogies of Access, Dissent, and Liberation, and The Art of Critical Pedagogies: Possibilities for Moving from Theory to Practice in Urban Schools. Morrell's scholarship focuses on how to provide youth the skills they need to succeed academically and function more powerfully as citizens in a multicultural democracy (see Multicultural education).  A front-page story in the Los Angeles Times described how "Education professors Ernest Morrell and Jeffrey Duncan-Andrade use hip-hop lyrics to deepen students' understanding of established literary texts."

Awards and recognitions 
In 1999, Morrell received a Certificate of Recognition for commitment to Oakland High School from the State of California Senate. Following graduate school, Morrell received the Outstanding Dissertation Award in 2001 from the University of California, Berkeley. He then received an American Educational Research Association/OERI postdoctoral fellowship for 2001–2004. In 2005, Morrell was selected for inclusion in Academic Keys Who's Who in Education. In 2008, Morrell received the Distinguished Teaching Award at University of California, Los Angeles. Morrell was featured in the UCLA Prime Magazine in an article titled, "7 Bruins Who Will Change the World."

Personal 
Morrell resides in South Bend with his wife, Jodene Morrell, and three sons.

Morrell is Catholic, and has spoken of the anti-Catholic nature of his former employers, namely Columbia University and the University of California system. He cited this as a factor in his decision to come to Notre Dame.

References 

1971 births
Living people
American political candidates
California Democrats
UC Berkeley Graduate School of Education alumni
UCLA Graduate School of Education and Information Studies faculty
University of California, Santa Barbara alumni
African-American Catholics